Meek is a Scottish surname. Notable people with the surname include:
 Albert Stewart Meek (1871–1943), British bird collector and naturalist
 Alexander Beaufort Meek (1814–1865), American politician, lawyer, writer and poet
 Barbara Meek (1934–2015), American actress
 Bill Meek (1922–1998), American football coach
 Carrie P. Meek (1926–2021), American politician from Florida
 Chantal Meek, canoer
 Donald Meek (1878–1946), Scottish character actor
 Emil Weber Meek (born 1988), Norwegian performer of martial art (MMA)
 Evan Meek, American baseball pitcher
 Fielding Bradford Meek (1817–1876), American geologist and paleontologist
 James Meek, minister
 James Meek (author)
 Janice Meek, ocean rower
 Jeffrey Meek, actor
 Jerry Meek politician
 Joe Meek (1929–1967), British record producer and composer
 Joseph Meek (1810–1875), American explorer, soldier and politician
 Kendrick Meek (born 1966), American politician from Florida
 Larissa Meek, American model
 MeeK (musician) (born 1971), Franco-British singer/songwriter.
 Meek (street artist), street artist based in Melbourne, Australia
 Patrick Meek, American speed skater
 Ronald L. Meek, economist
 S. P. Meek (1894–1972), US military chemist, early science fiction author, and children's author
 Seth Eugene Meek (1859–1914), American ichthyologist
 Stephen Meek (guide) (1805–1889), fur trapper and guide in the American west
 Theophile Meek, Canadian archaeologist
 Tom Meek, journalist

See also
 Meek (disambiguation)
 Meeks (disambiguation)